The New Moon Rising World Tour, also referred to as the Cosmic Egg Tour, was a concert tour by Australian rock band Wolfmother. The tour began on 17 September 2009 with a seven-show leg in Australia, followed by a short European tour in October, a North American leg comprising 24 shows and initially called for a second European leg in 2010. This was followed by an eleven show run in Australia, supporting AC/DC. The band then returned to North America, playing Lollapalooza and various other venues, including two shows in Mexico, and toured Asia and Australia in fall 2010. In early 2011, the band played the Big Day Out festivals in Australia and New Zealand. The tour then culminated after a round of festival and headlining dates in Europe over the summer, and went the studio to commence work on a third studio album. The tour was in support of the band's second album Cosmic Egg, and was the first to be completed by the four-piece lineup of the band formed in January 2009 after the original trio's breakup in August 2008.

On 30 May 2010, the band cancelled their entire tour of Europe, which would have had dates from May through July. The leg was cancelled due to illness. The band was due to play at many festivals, including Rock Am Ring, Rock Im Park, and Download Festival.

Set lists

Australia 2009
{{hidden
| headercss  = background: #ccccff; font-size: 100%; width: 40%;
| contentcss = text-align: left; font-size: 100%; width: 20%;
| header     = 19 September 2009
| content    = 
"Dimension"
"Cosmic Egg"
"White Unicorn"
"New Moon Rising"
"Woman"
"White Feather"
"Mind's Eye"
"Vagabond"
"10,000 Feet"
"Colossal"
Encore:
"Back Round"
"Joker & the Thief"
}}
{{hidden
| headercss  = background: #ccccff; font-size: 100%; width: 40%;
| contentcss = text-align: left; font-size: 100%; width: 20%;
| header     = 26 September 2009
| content    = 
"Joker & the Thief"
"Back Round"
"Colossal"
"New Moon Rising"
"Woman"
"Dimension"
"White Feather"
"Vagabond"
"Cosmic Egg"
"Mind's Eye"
Encore:
"California Queen"
"White Unicorn"
}}

Europe 2009
{{hidden
| headercss  = background: #ccccff; font-size: 100%; width: 40%;
| contentcss = text-align: left; font-size: 100%; width: 20%;
| header     = 14 October 2009
| content    = 
"Dimension"
"Cosmic Egg"
"White Unicorn"
"New Moon Rising"
"Woman"
"White Feather"
"Vagabond"
"Mind's Eye"
"10,000 Feet"
"Colossal"
Encore:
"Back Round"
"Joker & the Thief"
}}
{{hidden
| headercss  = background: #ccccff; font-size: 100%; width: 40%;
| contentcss = text-align: left; font-size: 100%; width: 20%;
| header     = 21 October 2009
| content    = 
"Dimension"
"Cosmic Egg"
"White Feather"
"New Moon Rising"
"California Queen"
"Woman"
"White Unicorn"
"Colossal"
"Sundial"
"Pilgrim"
"Mind's Eye"
Encore:
"Wuthering Heights" (Kate Bush cover)
"Vagabond"
"Back Round"
"Joker & the Thief"
}}

North America 2009
{{hidden
| headercss  = background: #ccccff; font-size: 100%; width: 40%;
| contentcss = text-align: left; font-size: 100%; width: 20%;
| header     = 29 October 2009
| content    = 
"Dimension"
"Cosmic Egg"
"California Queen"
"New Moon Rising"
"White Feather"
"Woman"
"White Unicorn"
"Colossal"
"Sundial"
"Pilgrim"
"Mind's Eye"
"10,000 Feet"
"In the Castle"
Encore:
"Wuthering Heights" (Kate Bush cover)
"Vagabond"
"Back Round"
"Joker & the Thief"
}}
{{hidden
| headercss  = background: #ccccff; font-size: 100%; width: 40%;
| contentcss = text-align: left; font-size: 100%; width: 20%;
| header     = 30 October 2009
| content    = 
"Caroline"
"Joker & the Thief"
}}
{{hidden
| headercss  = background: #ccccff; font-size: 100%; width: 40%;
| contentcss = text-align: left; font-size: 100%; width: 20%;
| header     = 6 November 2009
| content    = 
"Dimension"
"California Queen"
"Apple Tree"
"White Feather"
"Woman"
"New Moon Rising"
"Cosmic Egg"
"Colossal"
"Sundial"
"10,000 Feet"
"In the Castle"
"Mind's Eye"
"White Unicorn"
Encore:
"Wuthering Heights" (Kate Bush cover)
"Vagabond"
"Back Round"
"Joker & the Thief"
}}
{{hidden
| headercss  = background: #ccccff; font-size: 100%; width: 40%;
| contentcss = text-align: left; font-size: 100%; width: 20%;
| header     = 7 November 2009
| content    = 
"Dimension"
"Cosmic Egg"
"California Queen"
"New Moon Rising"
"Woman"
"White Unicorn"
"White Feather"
"Colossal"
"Sundial"
"Apple Tree"
"Mind's Eye"
"In the Castle"
Encore:
"Vagabond"
"Back Round"
"Joker & the Thief"
}}
{{hidden
| headercss  = background: #ccccff; font-size: 100%; width: 40%;
| contentcss = text-align: left; font-size: 100%; width: 20%;
| header     = 11 November 2009
| content    = 
"Dimension"
"Cosmic Egg"
"California Queen"
"New Moon Rising"
"Woman"
"White Feather"
"White Unicorn"
"Colossal"
"Sundial"
"Apple Tree"
"10,000 Feet"
"In the Castle"
Encore:
"Vagabond"
"Back Round"
"Joker & the Thief"
}}
{{hidden
| headercss  = background: #ccccff; font-size: 100%; width: 40%;
| contentcss = text-align: left; font-size: 100%; width: 20%;
| header     = 13 and 19 November 2009
| content    = 
"Dimension"
"Cosmic Egg"
"California Queen"
"New Moon Rising"
"Woman"
"White Unicorn"
"Colossal"
"White Feather"
"Sundial"
"Apple Tree"
"10,000 Feet"
"In the Castle"
Encore:
"Vagabond"
"Back Round"
"Joker & the Thief"
}}
{{hidden
| headercss  = background: #ccccff; font-size: 100%; width: 40%;
| contentcss = text-align: left; font-size: 100%; width: 20%;
| header     = 23 November 2009
| content    = 
"Dimension"
"Cosmic Egg"
"California Queen"
"New Moon Rising"
"Woman"
"White Unicorn"
"Sundial"
"White Feather"
"Colossal"
"Apple Tree"
Encore:
"Vagabond"
"Back Round"
"Joker & the Thief"
}}
{{hidden
| headercss  = background: #ccccff; font-size: 100%; width: 40%;
| contentcss = text-align: left; font-size: 100%; width: 20%;
| header     = 24 November 2009
| content    = 
"Dimension"
"Cosmic Egg"
"California Queen"
"New Moon Rising"
"Woman"
"White Unicorn"
"Colossal"
"White Feather"
"10,000 Feet"
"Sundial"
"Apple Tree"
"In the Castle"
Encore:
"By the Sword" (with Slash)
"Vagabond"
"Joker & the Thief"
}}

Europe 2010

Australia 2010 (AC/DC)

Tour dates

Personnel
Andrew Stockdale – lead vocals, lead guitar
Ian Peres – bass, keyboard, backing vocals
Aidan Nemeth – rhythm guitar
Dave Atkins – drums (until April 2010)
Will Rockwell-Scott – drums (April 2010 onwards)

References

General

Specific

External links
Wolfmother official website

Wolfmother
2009 concert tours
2010 concert tours
2011 concert tours